"Bab." may be an abbreviation for:

Charles Babington, an English botanist
The Babylonian Talmud

See also
 Bab (disambiguation)